The modern Malay or Indonesian alphabet (Brunei, Malaysia and Singapore: ,), consists of the 26 letters of the ISO basic Latin alphabet. It is the more common of the two alphabets used today to write the Malay language, the other being Jawi (a modified Arabic script). The Latin Malay alphabet is the official Malay script in Indonesia (as Indonesian), Malaysia (also called Malaysian) and Singapore, while it is co-official with Jawi in Brunei.

Historically, various scripts such as Pallava, Kawi and Rencong or Surat Ulu were used to write Old Malay, until they were replaced by Jawi during Islamic missionary missions in the Malay Archipelago.

The arrival of European colonial powers brought the Latin alphabet to the Malay Archipelago. As the Malay-speaking countries were divided between two colonial administrations (the Dutch and the British), two major different spelling orthographies were developed in the Dutch East Indies and British Malaya respectively, influenced by the orthographies of their respective colonial tongues. The Van Ophuijsen Spelling System used in the Dutch East Indies and later Indonesia was based on the Dutch alphabet. It was replaced by the simpler Republican Spelling System in 1947.

In 1972, as part of the effort of harmonizing spelling differences between the two countries, Indonesia and Malaysia each adopted a spelling reform plan, called the Perfected Spelling System in Indonesia and the New Rumi Spelling in Malaysia.

Although the representations of speech sounds are now largely identical in the Indonesian and Malay varieties, a number of minor spelling differences remain.

Letter names and pronunciations
Enhanced Indonesian Spelling System (abbreviated as EYD), New Rumi Spelling.

The Malay alphabet has a phonemic orthography; words are spelled the way they are pronounced, with few exceptions like the distinctions between /ə/ and /e/ where it is both written as E/e. The names of the letters, however, differ between Indonesia and rest of the Malay-speaking countries; while Malaysia, Brunei and Singapore follow the letter names of the English alphabet, Indonesia largely follows the letter names of the Dutch alphabet, making its implementation more faithful to the actual phonemic values of each letter. The letters otherwise represent the same sounds in all Malay-speaking countries.

The letters F, Q, V, X and Z are not used in spelling native Malay/Indonesian words. F and Z occur in loanwords from Arabic (e. g. fatah 'conquest, opening', zaman 'era, period, time') and from European languages (e. g. faktor 'factor', zoologi 'zoology'). V is used in loanwords from European  languages (e. g. valuta 'currency', provinsi 'province'). The letter Q is very rare: it is used for Arabic ﻕ in some loanwords, particularly related to religion: Qur'an, Al-Qur'an (spelling these words with the apostrophe is recommended by the Indonesian Ministry of Religion, the variants Quran and Alquran are deprecated; Malaysia uses Quran, Al-Quran), qari/qariah 'male/female Quran reader', qanun 'law established by Muslim sovereigns or by Aceh autonomous provincial government' (also qanun (instrument)). But many loanwords from Arabic words with ﻕ use k instead: makam 'tomb', mutlak 'absolute, complete'. Some words are spelled with q in Malaysia but with k in Indonesia: qasidah/kasidah 'qasida'. European loanwords use the letter k instead of q: kualiti (Malaysian)/kualitas (Indonesian) 'quality', frekuensi 'frequency'. The letter X is also very rare: it is used at the beginning of loanwords, e. g. xilofon 'xylophone', but replaced by ks at the middle and at the end of loanwords: taksi 'taxi', lateks 'latex', teks 'text' (some consonant clusters are regularly simplified at the end of loanwords: -st>-s, -nt>-n, -kt>-k).

* Many vowels are pronounced (and were formerly spelt) differently in Peninsular Malaysia and Sumatra (where Malay is native): tujuh is pronounced (and was spelt) tujoh, rambut as rambot, kain as kaen, pilih as pileh, etc., [e] and [o] are also allophones of /i/ and /u/ in closed final syllables in peninsular Malaysian and Sumatran. Many vowels were pronounced and formerly spelt differently that way also in East Malaysia, Brunei, and Indonesia.

In addition, there are digraphs that are not considered separate letters of the alphabet:

Pre-1972 spelling system

Pre-1972 British Malaya and Borneo/Brunei, Malaysia and Singapore orthography

Pre-1972 Dutch East Indies/Indonesia orthography

Comparison table

See also
 Jawi alphabet
 Congress Spelling System
 Javanese orthography

References

External links
 Malay alphabet
 Omniglot
 Coba-coba(Cuba-cuba) Indonesian & Malay
 Pedoman Umum Ejaan Bahasa Indonesia (PUEBI)
 Pedoman Umum Ejaan Bahasa Melayu

Latin alphabets
Malay language
Indonesian language